Eddy Blackman Stadion is a multi-purpose stadium in Livorno, Suriname. It is home to SVB Hoofdklasse club SCSV Takdier Boys and SVB Eerste Klasse outfits, SV Jai Hanuman and SCSV Kamal Dewaker.

The stadium was built by Badrinath Durga, who has been committed to the social development of Livorno for many years.

Location
The Eddy Blackman Stadium is located in the Northwest of Livorno on the Botromankiweg right off of the Martin Luther Kingweg, just south of the capital city Paramaribo.

References

Football venues in Suriname
Athletics (track and field) venues in Suriname
Multi-purpose stadiums in Suriname